The Marriage Ring is a lost 1918 American silent drama film directed by Fred Niblo.

Cast
 Enid Bennett as Anne Mertons
 Jack Holt as Rodney Heathe
 Robert McKim as Hugo Mertons
 Maude George as Aho
 Charles K. French as Koske
 Lydia Knott as Mrs. Heathe
 John Cossar as James Ward

Reception
Like many American films of the time, The Marriage Ring was subject to cuts by city and state film censorship boards. For example, the Chicago Board of Censors required cuts, in Reel 4, of the intertitle "Keep your kisses for your American lover; I have better here", three scenes of man embracing young native woman, all scenes of young woman dancing before men in tent, scene of man cutting telephone wires, and three scenes of man setting grass on fire with torch.

References

External links

1918 films
1918 drama films
American silent feature films
American black-and-white films
Films directed by Fred Niblo
Silent American drama films
Lost American films
1918 lost films
Lost drama films
1910s American films